Bae Cheol-soo's Music Camp is a South Korean radio show hosted by Bae Cheol-soo on MBC FM4U since 1990.

Awards and nominations

References

External links
 

South Korean music radio programs
South Korean talk radio programs
Munhwa Broadcasting Corporation
Pop music radio programs
South Korean radio programs